SS Kanguroo was a French heavy-lift ship built to transport submarines before World War I. She delivered submarines to Brazil and Peru before the war began. Requisitioned in 1914 by the French Navy, she was torpedoed by a German submarine in late 1916 and sunk at Funchal, Madeira.

Background and description
Kanguroo was a ship built to transport submarines for the shipbuilder Schneider et Cie. The company's submarines were too small and their endurance too limited to cross the oceans on their own. Schneider deemed towing them too risky so the company commissioned a purpose-built ship to deliver them safely to their destination. She had a crew of four officers and eighteen enlisted crewmen.

The ship was essentially a self-propelled floating dry dock with three main sections. The stern contained the engine, bridge, crew accommodations, workshops, pumps, electric generators and storage facilities for the submarine's torpedoes. The submarine's batteries were kept charged during the voyage by the current from the generators. The middle section consisted of a  double-hulled well deck with ballast tanks between its inner walls and the outer hull. The outer plating and structural members of Kanguroos bow were designed to be partially dismantled to give access to the short tunnel through the bow to the well deck. Additional ballast tanks were positioned below and on each side of the tunnel to raise and lower the bow.

Loading a submarine was a lengthy process that took weeks. The first step was to pump the forward ballast tanks empty which elevated the bow out of the water. Once it was dismantled, the ballast tanks were then filled to lower the bow and flood the well deck to allow the submarine to be winched aboard. The well deck's water-tight doors were then closed and the water in the dock was pumped overboard while the submarine settled onto its wooden bilge blocks. The bow was then reassembled and hatch covers were installed over the well deck. These prevented the ship from taking on water during a storm and allowed the crew to perform any necessary maintenance on the submarine while under way.

Construction and service 

Kanguroo was launched by Forges et Chantiers de la Gironde on 12 April 1912 at their shipyard in Bordeaux. She arrived in Peru on 19 October, after stops in São Vicente, Cape Verde, Buenos Aires, and Montevideo, but could not unload the submarine until 29 October. The ship delivered Ferres sister ship  in 1913 and the  the following year.

After the start of World War I in August 1914, the French Navy requisitioned the Kanguroo. A total of thirty-three foreign crewmen and eight Portuguese nationals died during the attack. A monument with a sculpture by Francisco Franco de Sousa was raised in 1917 to commemorate the incident.

References

Bibliography

External links

 SS Kanguroo on wrecksite.eu

1912 ships
Ships built in France
Steamships of France
World War I naval ships of France
Ships sunk by German submarines in World War I
Maritime incidents in 1916
World War I shipwrecks in the Atlantic Ocean
Heavy lift ships